The 2004 season was the St. Louis Rams' 67th in the National Football League and their tenth in St. Louis.

Although the Rams’ record was good enough to qualify for the postseason, they did so without posting a winning record. Statistics site Football Outsiders calculates that the 2004 Rams were, play-for-play, the worst team to make the playoffs in the site's rating history. This was also the last time the Rams made the playoffs until 2017, when the franchise returned to Los Angeles; thus, this was the team’s final playoff appearance in St. Louis.

The season is memorable for the Rams drafting running back Steven Jackson with the 24th pick of the 2004 NFL Draft. During the season, the Rams relied less on Marshall Faulk, who was slowed by age and injuries, forcing Jackson to garner a bulk of the carries. He finished the season with 673 rushing yards despite seeing limited action.

The Rams, in the playoffs, defeated their rival Seattle Seahawks in the Wild Card round, but their 10th season in St. Louis ended in a 47–17 blowout to the Atlanta Falcons in the Divisional round.

For the first time this season, the Rams completed a 2–0 regular season sweep of the rival Seahawks. They would not accomplish this again until 2015.

Offseason

Draft

Roster

Regular season

Schedule

Week 1

    
    
    
    
    
    

Marshall Faulk 22 Rush, 128 Yds
Isaac Bruce 9 Rec, 112 Yds

Standings

Playoffs

Wild Card

    
    
    
    
    
    
    
    
    

Marc Bulger 18/32, 313 Yds
Torry Holt 6 Rec, 108 Yds
Kevin Curtis 4 Rec, 107 Yds

References

   

St. Louis Rams
St. Louis Rams seasons
St Louis